Admiral of the Fleet Sir George Cockburn, 10th Baronet,  (22 April 1772 – 19 August 1853) was a British Royal Navy officer. As a captain he was present at the Battle of Cape St Vincent in February 1797 during the French Revolutionary Wars and commanded the naval support at the reduction of Martinique in February 1809 during the Napoleonic Wars. He also directed the capture and Burning of Washington on 24 August 1814 as an advisor to Major General Robert Ross during the War of 1812. He went on to be First Naval Lord and in that capacity sought to improve the standards of gunnery in the fleet, forming a gunnery school at Portsmouth; later he ensured that the Navy had the latest steam and screw technology and put emphasis on the ability to manage seamen without the need to resort to physical punishment.

Naval career

Cockburn was born the second son of Sir James Cockburn, 8th Baronet and his second wife Augusta Anne Ayscough. He was educated at the Royal Navigational School and joined the Royal Navy in March 1781 as a Captain's servant in the sixth-rate HMS Resource. He joined the sloop HMS Termagant in 1787, transferred to the sloop HMS Ariel under the Commander-in-Chief, East Indies in 1788, and then became midshipman in the fifth-rate HMS Hebe in the Channel Squadron in 1791. He joined the fourth-rate HMS Romney in the Mediterranean Fleet later in 1791 and then became acting lieutenant in the fifth-rate HMS Pearl in 1792. He was promoted to the substantive rank of lieutenant on 2 January 1793, and became lieutenant on the brig-sloop HMS Orestes later that month before transferring to the first-rate HMS Britannia in the Mediterranean Fleet in February 1793 and then to the first-rate HMS Victory, Flagship of the Mediterranean Fleet, in June 1793. He became commander of the sloop HMS Speedy in October 1793 and acting captain of the fifth-rate HMS Inconstant in January 1794.

Cockburn was promoted to the substantive rank of captain on 10 February 1794 and given command of the fifth-rate HMS Meleager in the Mediterranean Fleet later that month. He took part in the blockade of Livorno in March 1795, and he was given command of the frigate HMS Minerve in August 1796, having been mentioned in despatches in May 1796. He fought a gallant action with the Spanish frigate Santa Sabina in January 1797 and was present at the battle of Cape St Vincent in February 1797 during the French Revolutionary Wars.

Minerves boats' crews, in company with those of the frigate , successfully cut out the French ship Mutine at Santa Cruz, Tenerife in May 1797.

Cockburn was given command of the fifth-rate HMS Phaeton on the East Indies Station in July 1803, of the third-rate HMS Captain in July 1806, and of the third-rate HMS Pompée in March 1808. He commanded the naval support at the reduction of Martinique in February 1809 during the Napoleonic Wars, for which he received the thanks of Parliament.

Cockburn commanded a squadron of warships for the landings in Walcheren in July 1809 during the Walcheren Campaign. He took command of the third-rate HMS Implacable off the coast of Spain in January 1810 and sailed to Quiberon Bay with a small squadron whose mission was to arrange the escape of the King of Spain, whom the French had imprisoned at the Château de Valençay. The mission failed when Ferdinand refused to have anything to do with the British. Cockburn was promoted to commodore, hoisting his broad pennant in the fourth-rate HMS Grampus in November 1811.

War of 1812

Cockburn was promoted to rear admiral on 12 August 1812, and hoisted his flag in the third-rate HMS Marlborough as commander of a squadron of ships off Cadiz. He was reassigned in November 1812 to the North American Station, where he played a major role in the War of 1812 as second-in-command to Admiral Sir John Warren until the end of March 1814, and then to Warren's successor Admiral Sir Alexander Cochrane for the rest of the war.

He cruised relentlessly up and down the Chesapeake Bay and other parts of the Atlantic coast in 1813 and 1814, seizing American shipping, disrupting commerce, and raiding the ports. The author of a book about this era stated that Cockburn's mission was "to rough up the Americans ... torching any homes construed as being supportive of the militia ... promoting fear and hatred". This proved to be an effective strategy that succeeded in creating opposition to "Mr. Madison's War" among the Americans. 
  
The most important of Cockburn's involvements during the War was his role in the capture and burning of Washington on 24 August 1814, undertaken as an advisor to Major General Robert Ross. The plan to attack Washington had been formulated by Cockburn who accurately predicted that "within a short period of time, with enough force, we could easily have at our mercy the capital". A CBC News article described Major General Robert Ross as less optimistic than Cockburn. Ross "never dreamt for one minute that an army of 3,500 men with 1,000 marines reinforcement, with no cavalry, hardly any artillery, could march 50 miles inland and capture an enemy capital.

Cockburn had reached Benedict, Maryland, via the Patuxent River with his warships; the troops then disembarked and marched to Washington to mount the attack. The 4,500 troops, commanded by Major General Robert Ross, successfully captured the capital city on 24 August 1814. Cockburn accompanied Ross and recommended burning the entire city. Ross decided instead to put only public buildings to the torch, including the White House and the US Capitol, while sparing nearly all of the privately-owned properties.

Following the battle, Cockburn oversaw the destruction of the National Intelligencer newspaper's offices and printing house by his soldiers; he famously stated: "Be sure that all the C's are destroyed, so that the rascals cannot any longer abuse my name."

He was appointed a Knight Commander of the Order of the Bath on 4 January 1815.

Subsequent years
In August 1815, Cockburn was given the job of conveying Napoleon I in the third-rate HMS Northumberland to Saint Helena. Cockburn remained there for some months as governor of the island and Commander-in-Chief of the Cape of Good Hope Station. He was advanced to Knight Grand Cross of the Order of the Bath on 20 February 1818, and promoted to vice-admiral on 12 August 1819. He was elected a Fellow of the Royal Society on 21 December 1820.

Political career

Entering politics, Cockburn was elected Tory Member of Parliament for Portsmouth at the 1818 general election and was appointed a Junior Naval Lord in the Liverpool ministry in April 1818. He became Tory Member of Parliament for Weobly at the 1820 general election and, having become Major-General of the Royal Marine Forces on 5 April 1821 and a member of the Privy Council on 30 April 1827, he was elected Tory Member of Parliament for Plymouth at a by-election in June 1828. While serving as a Junior Naval Lord, he forced the resignation of the Duke of Clarence as Lord High Admiral in September 1828 for acting without the authority of the Board of the Admiralty. Cockburn was elevated to First Naval Lord in the Wellington ministry in September 1828 and in that capacity sought to improve the standards of gunnery in the fleet, forming a gunnery school at Portsmouth. He resigned when the Government fell from power in November 1830, but remained active in Parliamentary affairs, including leading the opposition to abolition of the Navy Board in 1832. After losing his seat in Parliament at the 1832 general election he returned to sea and became Commander-in-Chief of the North America and West Indies Station, hoisting his flag in the fourth-rate HMS Vernon, in December 1832.

Cockburn became First Naval Lord briefly again in the First Peel ministry in December 1834 but resigned when the Government fell from power in April 1835. He then returned to his old post as Commander-in-Chief of the North America and West Indies Station. Promoted to full admiral on 10 January 1837, he was elected Tory Member of Parliament for Ripon at a by-election in September 1841 and also became First Naval Lord again in the Second Peel ministry later that month. As First Sea Lord he ensured that the Navy had latest steam and screw technology and put emphasis of the ability to manage seamen without the need to resort to physical punishment. He resigned when the Government fell from power in July 1846, became Rear-Admiral of the United Kingdom on 10 August 1847 and was promoted to Admiral of the Fleet on 1 July 1851. He inherited the family baronetcy from his elder brother in February 1852 and died at Leamington Spa on 19 August 1853. He is buried in Kensal Green Cemetery.

Cockburn Sound in Western Australia was named after him by Captain James Stirling in 1827. Cockburn Island, at the tip of the Antarctic Peninsula, was named for him by Sir James Clark Ross during his Antarctic expedition between 1839 and 1843. Cape Cockburn and Cockburn Bay on Nelson Island on the west coast of Canada were named after him.

Family
In 1809, Cockburn married his cousin Mary Cockburn. The couple had one surviving daughter, Augusta Harriot Mary Cockburn (d. 1869), who married Captain John Cochrane Hoseason.

Cockburn's distant cousins are writer Alexander Cockburn (1941-2012) and actress Olivia Wilde.

References

Sources

Further reading

External links 

 
 

|-

|-

|-

|-

|-

1772 births
1853 deaths
English people of Scottish descent
Military personnel from London
First Sea Lords and Chiefs of the Naval Staff
Lords of the Admiralty
Royal Navy admirals of the fleet
British naval commanders of the Napoleonic Wars
Royal Navy personnel of the War of 1812
Conservative Party (UK) MPs for English constituencies
Members of the Privy Council of the United Kingdom
Cockburn, George, 10th Baronet
Knights Grand Cross of the Order of the Bath
UK MPs 1818–1820
UK MPs 1820–1826
UK MPs 1826–1830
UK MPs 1830–1831
UK MPs 1831–1832
UK MPs 1841–1847
George
Fellows of the Royal Society
Burials at Kensal Green Cemetery
Members of the Parliament of the United Kingdom for Plymouth
British people of the War of 1812
British military personnel of the War of 1812